Joint-Stock Company "Vologda Aviation Enterprise", doing business as Vologda Air Company (VAC, Вологодское авиапредприятие, Vologodskoje aviapredprijatije), is an airline with its head office on the property of Vologda Airport in Vologda, Russia. It operates scheduled domestic and regional passenger services. It was formerly the Aeroflot Vologda division, United Air Detachment of Northern Territorial Board of Civil Aviation (1952–1963), Vologda United Air Detachment (1963–1991) and Vologda Air Company (1991–present).

The airline also has branches located on the properties of the airports serving Belozersk, Kichmengsky Gorodok, Nikolsk, Nyuksenitsa, Totma, Veliky Ustyug, and Vytegra. These branches are not legal divisions of the company.

At any one time they have an average of 1500 staff working there.

History

On 1 September 1931 there was the first flight through the new air-strip at Vologda – Moscow-Yaroslavl-Vologda-Archangelsk. 

To make best use of their new manmade landing strips, they received their Yak-40 aircraft in 1969 which spurred development. In 1978 they moved to a new airfield.

Services

The airline carries out scheduled and charter passenger and emergency services, aerial thermal imaging and photography, search-and-rescue and aerial patrol flights

Destinations

The airline operates scheduled flights on its Yakovlev Yak-40 aircraft between Vologda and
 Stary Oskol (Stary Oskol Airport)
 Moscow (Vnukovo International Airport)
 Saint Petersburg (Pulkovo Airport)

Fleet

As of July 2019 the Vologda Air fleet includes

11 Mil Mi-8
6 Yakovlev Yak-40
3 Antonov An-2

References

External links
Official website 

Airlines of Russia
Companies based in Vologda Oblast